Greatest Hits is the first compilation album by American country music artist Neal McCoy, released in 1997 on Atlantic Records. The album comprises ten songs, nine of which were previously included on his second through fifth studio albums. "The Shake" was newly recorded for this compilation, and was later reprised on the following album, 1997's Be Good at It.

Track listing

Charts

Weekly charts

Year-end charts

Certifications

References

Allmusic (see infobox)

1997 greatest hits albums
Neal McCoy albums
Albums produced by Barry Beckett
Atlantic Records compilation albums